Abdisho II ibn al-Arid was Patriarch of the Church of the East from 1074 to 1090.

Life
Before his elevation to patriarch, Abdisho served as bishop of Nisibis (Nusaybin).

See also
 List of patriarchs of the Church of the East

References

Citations

Bibliography
 Abbeloos, J. B., and Lamy, T. J., Bar Hebraeus, Chronicon Ecclesiasticum (3 vols, Paris, 1877)
 Assemani, J. A., De Catholicis seu Patriarchis Chaldaeorum et Nestorianorum (Rome, 1775)
 Brooks, E. W., Eliae Metropolitae Nisibeni Opus Chronologicum (Rome, 1910)
 Gismondi, H., Maris, Amri, et Salibae: De Patriarchis Nestorianorum Commentaria I: Amri et Salibae Textus (Rome, 1896)
 Gismondi, H., Maris, Amri, et Salibae: De Patriarchis Nestorianorum Commentaria II: Maris textus arabicus et versio Latina (Rome, 1899)

Patriarchs of the Church of the East
11th-century bishops of the Church of the East
Nestorians in the Abbasid Caliphate